Jacek Koman (born 15 August 1956) is a Polish actor and singer.

Early life
Koman was born in Bielsko-Biała, Poland, to actors Halina Koman (née Dobrowolska; born 3 January 1923) and Adam Koman (24 December 1922 – 1 December 2005), and came to Australia in 1982 with his brother Tomek. They landed in Perth before heading over to Melbourne, where he began acting again.

Koman attended the National Film School in Łódź, where he studied acting alongside Małgorzata Potocka, Andrzej Szczytko and Piotr Skiba (1974-78). His first professional stage appearance was as Lysander in a production of A Midsummer Night's Dream in Bielsko-Biała in 1978.

Career

In Melbourne, Koman met his partner, Australian actress Catherine McClements, in the late 1980s at the Anthill Theatre. They now have two children together – Clementine Coco (born July 2001) and Quincy (born May 2007). The couple have worked together a number of times, including films Redheads and Floodhouse, as well as an episode of Rush in 2009, and theatre productions Cruel and Tender (2005), Macbeth (2003), The Blind Giant is Dancing (1995) and Angels in America (1994).

In 2011, he was nominated for an AACTA award for his guest performance in Spirited. In 2012, he appeared as "The Great Hypno" in the Australian television series Miss Fisher's Murder Mysteries. In 2013, he returned to the stage after an eight-year absence, in Tom Holloway's translation of Durrenmatt's Dance of Death at the Malthouse Theatre in Melbourne.

Music career

Koman is also the lead singer of VulgarGrad, a Melbourne band who play Russian-style music and who formed in 2004.

Filmography
 Bezposrednie polaczenie (TV, 1979) – Slawek Tietz
 Holidays on the River Yarra (1991) − Mercenary
 Redheads (1992) – Lawyer
 Phoenix (TV, 1993) – Steward (one episode)
 Lucky Break (1994) – Detective Yuri Borodinoff
 Twisted Tales (TV, 1995)
 What I Have Written (1996) – Jeremy Fliszar
 Thank God He Met Lizzie (1997) – Raoul
 Wildside (TV, 1998) – Barry Lipinski (one episode)
 The Sound of One Hand Clapping (1998) – Picotti
 Moulin Rouge! (2001) – The Unconscious Argentinean
 The Secret Life of Us (TV, 2001) – Dominic
 Horseplay (2002) – Roman
 Floodhouse (TV, 2003) – Anselm
 Stingers (TV, 2003) – Daniel Tedesco (one episode)
 Mary Bryant (TV, 2005) – Wanjon (part II)
 Children of Men (2006) – Tomasz
 Tripping Over (TV, 2006) – Magnus
 Romulus, My Father (2007) – Vacek
 Defiance (2008) – Koscik
 Australia (2008) – Ivan
 Kochaj i tańcz (English title: Love and Dance) (2008) – Jan Kettler
 Rush (TV, 2009) – Anton Buczek (one episode)
 Lonesdale (2010)
 Kolysanka (English title: Lullaby) (2010) – Postman Kaminski
 City Homicide – Andro Budjman (one episode, 2010)
 Ratownicy (TV, 2010) – Piotr Rojek
 Usta usta (TV, 2010) – Pawel Sliwinski (one episode)
 East West 101 (TV, 2011) – Roman Wisniewski (two episodes)
 The Hunter (2011) – Middleman
 Small Time Gangster (TV, 2011) – Artie (two episodes)
 Spirited (TV, 2011) – Potter the Man (four episodes)
 Ghost Rider: Spirit of Vengeance (2011) – Terrokov
 Jack Irish (TV, 2016 - 2021) - Orton (13 episodes)
 Miss Fisher's Murder Mysteries (TV, 2012) – Mr Merton (one episode)
 The Doctors (TV, 2012) – Leon Jasinski
 The Great Gatsby (2013)
 Top of the Lake (TV, 2013) – Wolfgang Zanic
 Shopping (2013) - Bennie
 Son of a Gun (2014) - Sam
 Mustangs FC (TV, 2017 - 2019) - Danny
 Jungle (2017)
 Rake (TV, 2018) - Jakub (eight episodes)
 Tidelands (Netflix series, 2018) - Gregory Stolin
 The Hater (2020) - Robert Krasucki
 The Woods (miniseries) (TV, 2020) - Dawid Goldsztajn

Theatre work
 The Emigrants (1987, The New Dolphin Theatre, Perth)
 The Hope (1987, The Arts Centre, Melbourne and The Playhouse, Perth)
 Moliere aka The Cabal of Hypocrites (1988, Key Studios, Melbourne) – Brother Strength
 The Imaginary Invalid (1989, Anthill Theatre, Melbourne) – Cleante
 The Maids (1989, Anthill Theatre, Melbourne) – Solange
 The Master and Margarita (1993, Five Dollar Theatre Company) - The Master
 Angels in America (1994, The Playhouse, Melbourne) – Roy Cohn
 Blue Murder (1994, Belvoir St Theatre Downstairs, Sydney) – Blue
 Hamlet (1994, Belvoir St Theatre, Sydney) – Claudius
 The Blind Giant is Dancing (1995, Belvoir St Theatre, Sydney) – Ramon Gris
 The Caucasian Chalk Circle (1998, Belvoir St Theatre, Sydney) – Azdac
 As You Like It (1999, Belvoir St Theatre) – Jacques
 The Marriage of Figaro (2000, Belvoir St Theatre, Sydney) – Figaro
 Emma's Nose (2001, Belvoir St Theatre, Sydney) – Wilhelm Fliess
 Endgame (2003, Sydney Theatre Company) – Hamm
 Macbeth (2003, Belvoir St Theatre, Sydney) – Macbeth
 A Midsummer Night's Dream (2004, Belvoir St Theatre, Sydney) – Nick Bottom
 Cruel and Tender (2005, Belvoir St Theatre, Sydney) – The General

References

Notes

External links

1956 births
Male actors from Melbourne
Musicians from Melbourne
Australian male singers
Australian male film actors
Australian male stage actors
Australian male television actors
Polish emigrants to Australia
People from Bielsko-Biała
Living people
Łódź Film School alumni